Markella Hatziano is an operatic mezzo-soprano born in Athens, Greece.

Early life, education and debut

Hatziano entered the Greek National Conservatoire at the age of 12 as a scholarship student. She studied with Georgia Georgilopoulou, graduating summa cum laude at the age of 17. She studied repertoire and interpretation with the legendary baritone Tito Gobbi for three years. She came to international attention as the second place finalist in the BBC Cardiff Singer of the World competition and the winner of the first Tito Gobbi International Competition. Hatziano short after graduation made her very early professional debut with the Oxford Symphony Orchestra at the Odeon of Herodes Atticus in Athens. Her operatic debut took place at the Greek National Opera at the age of 23 performing Princess Eboli in "Don Carlos" by Giuseppe Verdi.

International career

She debuted on the international stage with the Opera Company of Boston under Sarah Caldwell as Suzuki in "Madama Butterfly" by Giacomo Puccini, Neris in "Médée" by Luigi Cherubini, Amneris in "Aida", soloist in Messa da Requiem by Giuseppe Verdi and at the Sofia Opera as Azucena in "Il Trovatore". She gained great international recognition in December 1993 when she performed on short notice the role of Didon in "Les Troyens" by Hector Berlioz in highly praised concert performances at the Barbican Centre with the London Symphony Orchestra under Colin Davis.

She has performed the roles of Dalila ("Samson et Dalila" by Camille Saint-Saëns), Amneris ("Aida" by Verdi), Eboli ("Don Carlos" by Verdi), Azucena ("Il Trovatore" by Verdi), Didon ("Les Troyens" by Hector Berlioz), Marguerite ("La damnation de Faust" by Hector Berlioz), Charlotte ("Werther" by Jules Massenet), Santuzza ("Cavalleria rusticana" by Pietro Mascagni) and Judith ("Bluebeard's Castle" by Béla Bartók) at many of the world's most prestigious opera houses and festivals including for example the Royal Opera House, Teatro alla Scala, Liceu, Teatro Real, San Francisco Opera, Staatsoper Berlin, Teatro Colón, Musikverein Wien, Royal Albert Hall, Tanglewood Music Festival, Maggio Musicale Fiorentino, Salzburg Festival and the Ancient Theatre of Epidaurus.

She has appeared with many of the world's top symphony orchestras including for example the Vienna Philharmonic, New York Philharmonic, Boston Symphony Orchestra, Chicago Symphony Orchestra, Los Angeles Philharmonic, BBC Symphony Orchestra, Mozarteum Orchestra Salzburg, Royal Philharmonic, Staatskapelle Berlin, Oslo Philharmonic, RAI National Symphony Orchestra, as well as the two Greek state orchestras, i.e., the Athens State Orchestra and the Thessaloniki State Symphony Orchestra, performing works by Verdi, Chausson, Ravel, Berlioz, Beethoven and Mahler.

She has collaborated with many world-renowned opera singers, such as José Carreras, Jessye Norman, Montserrat Caballé, Shirley Verrett, José Cura, Josephine Barstow, Gwyneth Jones, Robert Hale, Simon Estes, Dmitri Hvorostovsky, stage directors Robert Wilson and Franco Zeffirelli, conductors Daniel Barenboim, Christoph von Dohnányi, Zubin Mehta, Bernard Haitink, Michel Plasson, Esa-Pekka Salonen, Seiji Ozawa, Kent Nagano, Mariss Jansons,  among others, and the Greek composers Mikis Theodorakis, Vangelis and Eleni Karaindrou.

Recordings

Manolis Kalomiris: Symphony No. 2 "Of the Good and Simple People" | Soloist: Markella Hatziano, mezzo-soprano | The Orchestra & Choir of the Bulgarian Radio & Television conducted by Byron Fidetzis (Label: Concert Athens, 1986)
Manolis Kalomiris: "Evening Legends" Song Cycles A & B | Markella Hatziano (mezzo-soprano), Danae Kara (piano) (Label: Concert Athens, 1987)
Manolis Kalomiris: "Oblivion" | Markella Hatziano (mezzo-soprano) | Aris Garoufalis (piano), Tatsis Apostolidis (violin), Ersi Kaguelari (violin), Yannis Vatikiotis (viola), Telis Katsikakis (cello) (Label: Concert Athens, 1987)
Giuseppe Verdi: Messa da Requiem | Michèle Crider (soprano), Markella Hatziano (mezzo-soprano), Gabriel Sadé (tenor), Robert Lloyd (bass) | London Symphony Orchestra and Chorus conducted by Richard Hickox (Label: Chandos Records, 1996)
Ernest Bloch: "Macbeth" | Jean-Philippe Lafont, baritone (Macbeth) and Markella Hatziano, mezzo-soprano (Lady Macbeth) | Orchestre Philharmonique de Montpellier Languedoc-Roussillon & Choeur de la Radio Lettone conducted by Friedemann Layer (Live recording, 26 July 1999 – Festival de Radio France et Montpellier – label: Actes Sud, 1999. This was awarded the Grand Prix de l'Académie Charles Cros)
Hatziano sings Liszt (13 songs by Franz Liszt) | Markella Hatziano (mezzo-soprano), Steve Larson (piano) (Label: Classical Masterworks, 2010)

Guest artist in

Vangelis: Direct (track: "Glorianna (Hymn a la Femme)" performed by Markella Hatziano, mezzo-soprano (Labels: Arista Records, 1988 – Esoteric Recordings, 2013)
Eleni Karaindrou: Music and Songs for the Theatre (Label: Mikri Arktos, 2015)

Visual artist
Hatziano is also a painter. The use of colors in multiple levels on large scale wooden surfaces is the distinctive style of her artwork

References

External links

Markella Hatziano's discography at Discogs

Year of birth missing (living people)
Living people
Singers from Athens
Greek mezzo-sopranos
20th-century Greek women opera singers
21st-century Greek women opera singers